Events from the year 1728 in art.

Events
 October 20 – Copenhagen Fire of 1728: The worst fire in the history of Copenhagen breaks out. It lasts for 3 days and destroys important cultural treasures such as the University of Copenhagen library and original Baroque interiors of the Reformed Church, Copenhagen.
 Jean-Baptiste-Siméon Chardin is admitted to the Royal Academy.
 William Hogarth begins painting scenes from The Beggar's Opera.

Paintings

 Canaletto (1725–1728) (Hermitage Museum, Saint Petersburg)
 View of Church of San Giovanni dei Battuti on the Isle of Murano
 View of the Isles of San Michele, San Cristoforo and Murano from the Fondamenta Nuove
 Jean-Baptiste-Siméon Chardin – Der Roschen (Cat with Stingray)

Births
 March 12 – Anton Raphael Mengs, German painter (died 1779)
 April 20 – Nicolas Henri Joseph de Fassin, Belgian landscape painter (died 1811)
 May 24 – Jean-Baptiste Pillement, Rococo painter, designer and engraver (died 1808)
 July 1 – Nicolas-Guy Brenet, French historical painter (died 1792)
 date unknown
 Johan Alm, Finnish painter and field sergeant (died 1810)
 Pietro Bardellino – Italian painter (died 1819)
 Fabio Berardi, Italian engraver (died 1788)
 Charles Catton, English painter (died 1798)
 John Clayton, English painter (died 1800)
 Nathan Drake, English painter (died 1778)
 Ubaldo Gandolfi, Italian painter (died 1781)
 Johan Philip Korn, Swedish painter (died 1796)
 Marie-Thérèse Reboul, French painter of natural history, still lifes, and flowers (died 1805)

Deaths
 January 26 – Paolo de Matteis, Italian painter who worked for the Spanish Viceroy of Naples (born 1662)
 April 21 – Cardinal Filippo Antonio Gualterio, art collector (born 1660)
 September 21 – Francis Place, English gentleman draughtsman, potter, engraver and printmaker (born 1647)
 November 27 – Santi Prunati, Italian painter of many churches in and around Verona (born 1652/1656)
 December 8 – Camillo Rusconi, Italian sculptor (born 1658)
 date unknown
 Isaac Paling, Dutch Golden Age painter (born 1640)
 Yang Jin, Chinese painter during the Qing Dynasty (born 1644)

 
Years of the 18th century in art
1720s in art